Pierson Dane Fodé (born November 6, 1991) is an American actor, Internet personality, and model known for his roles as Brooks on Disney Channel's Jessie and Ely in the 2015 romantic comedy film Naomi and Ely's No Kiss List. Fodé has gone on to portray Thomas Forrester on the CBS drama series The Bold and the Beautiful, as well as make appearances in Tacoma FD,  Dynasty and The Real Bros of Simi Valley. Fodé previously starred in a CW pilot, "Glamorous".

Early life
Fodé was born in Moses Lake, Washington, a small town in eastern Washington, to Ron and Robin. He has two older brothers, Preston and Payton, and a younger sister, Pharron. He grew up there with his family on a farm. At the age of 13, when he was still in high school, he founded  Pierced Productions, in which he produced over 20 short films, wrote and played the lead role. After graduating from high school with an AA from a local college, he set off for his acting career at the age of 18. He currently resides in Los Angeles.

Career

Acting 
Fodé made his acting debut in 2012 in the Nickelodeon sitcom iCarly, where he appeared as Todd. In the same year, he received the YouTube Soap Opera Award for the lead role of Jared in Runaways, the web series running for two seasons. He then served in the television film Wrath of God: Confrontation as Kruger and in a guest role in Hello Ladies.

From 2013 to 2014, Fodé portrayed Blazer in the web series Storytellers. In 2014, he starred in the horror film Indigenous, which was shown at the Tribeca Film Festival, and acted in films Kill Game and Drag Worms. He also had a recurring role in the Disney Channel series Jessie for a five-episode story arc.

In 2015, Fodé starred opposite Victoria Justice as “Ely” in the romantic comedy indie film Naomi and Ely's No Kiss List. He also returned to TV to take over the role of Thomas Forrester on the CBS Daytime soap opera The Bold and the Beautiful.  On September 7, 2017, Soap Opera Digest announced that Fodé would depart the role of Thomas; he made his last appearance on September 13, 2017 before reprising his portrayal of Thomas for a short-term storyline in 2018.  

Fodé is set to appear in the upcoming film The Man from Toronto, an action-comedy starring Kevin Hart, Woody Harrelson, and Kaley Cuoco.

Model
Fodé signed to Wilhelmina Models in 2011. As a model, he received several awards such as Star of the Year, Best Runway Walk, Best Fashion Print Photos, Best Scene Performance, Best TV Commercial Read Beauty and Best Smile. As a model, he shot with Bruce Webber for Abercrombie & Fitch; Vanity Fair; G-Star; Demand Magazine; Akira Clothing; Gilly Hicks; and other major national brands & publications.

Personal life
In June 2019, Fodé revealed on Instagram that he suffered brain trauma and blackouts, and was wearing a heart monitor to help track his blackouts. He has made a full recovery and is actively engaged in trying to help others with serious trauma and those who want to help. Pierson enjoys riding his motorcycle; skydiving; parkour; and actively volunteering with charities such as Saving Innocence, Heifer International, and St. Jude's in Los Angeles.

Fodé started dating actress Saxon Sharbino in 2020.

Filmography

Film

Television

Web

Awards and nominations

References

External links
 

1991 births
Living people
American male film actors
American male television actors
Male actors from Washington (state)
Male models from Washington (state)
American male soap opera actors
People from Moses Lake, Washington